Steve Ewing is the lead singer of the St. Louis, Missouri-based band The Urge. Ewing made eight records with the band, and they toured for over a decade with heavyweights such as 311, Korn, and Incubus. Their three major label records on Immortal/Epic and Immortal/Virgin Records sold nearly one million copies worldwide. In 1998, Steve Ewing and The Urge scored a Billboard Top Ten hit, "Jump Right In" from their album Master of Styles. He now does solo work with The Steve Ewing Band, The Steve Ewing Duo, Master Blaster and acoustic shows with guitarist Trent Reed and Adam Hansbrough.

A documentary film about his life and career called Substance & Sound is currently being filmed, produced, and directed by Doo-Wop Productions LLC, a video production house out of St. Louis, Mo.

Ewing is the owner and operator of Steve's Hot Dogs, a legendary St. Louis restaurant at 3145 South Grand. A new location will be opening at 5232 Delmar in the summer of 2023. The restaurant has been featured on the Cooking Channel, the Food Network and is the home of the Official Hot Dog of St. Louis.

References

External links

African-American rock musicians
African-American rock singers
Living people
Musicians from St. Louis
1969 births
Singers from Missouri
21st-century African-American people
20th-century African-American people